Ploska is a rural locality (a village) in Chernovskoye Rural Settlement, Bolshesosnovsky District, Perm Krai, Russia. The population was 92 as of 2010. There are 3 streets.

Geography 
It is located 7.5 km south-west from Chernovskoye.

References 

Rural localities in Bolshesosnovsky District